The Party of Friendship, Equality and Peace (abbr.  Κ.Ι.Ε.Φ.,  KIEF; , DEBP) is a Greek political party founded to represent the interests of native Muslims of Greece. The recognised Muslim minority in Greece consists mainly of Pomaks, Muslims of Turkish and Bulgarian origin, and Roma.

Overview
The party was created on 13 September 1991 by Sadik Achmet, who presided over it until his death in 1995. Achmet was succeeded by his widow Isik Achmet (Işık Ahmet) who led until 1999. The party was then led by Achmet Chatziosman until 2007 when Chatziosman was elected member of the Greek Parliament for the Panhellenic Socialist Movement (PASOK). The next chairman, Moustafa Bosnak, was replaced in July 2010 by Moustafa Ali Tsavous.

Achmet Chatziosman was elected in 2002 and 2006 for the Rhodope Prefecture on a common PASOK-Synaspismós list and was vice-prefect from 2002 to 2007.

The 5th Ordinary General Congress of the party took place on 5 January 2019 at the Party Headquarters. Tsidem Asafoglou, the only candidate in the congress that took place in the party's headquarters, was elected as the new party president.

Notable members 
 Sadik Achmet
 Xasan Patsaman
 Ismail Molla
 Achmet Faikoglou
 Achmet Chatziosman
 Tsetin Mantatzi 
 Galip Galip
 Isik Achmet
 Moustafa Mposnak
 Moustafa Ali Tsavous

Electoral results

Hellenic Parliament

European Parliament

Although unable to send MEPs due to 3% national threshold, DEB emerged as the first party in Xanthi and Rhodope regional units in both 2014 and 2019 European elections, drawing attention. In 2019 elections, DEB received 38% of the votes in Xanthi regional unit and 25.24% of the votes in Rhodope regional unit. DEB also received 1.30% of the votes in Evros regional unit. While in the overall region of Eastern Macedonia and Thrace, the party came in as the 3rd biggest party after top 2 national parties New Democracy and Syriza. Other regions outside Eastern Macedonia and Thrace where votes were cast for DEB were listed as Dodecanese, Thessaloniki, and Athens.

Other Turkish minority parties in South-Eastern Europe 
 Movement for Rights and Freedoms (Bulgaria)
 Turkish Democratic Party of Kosovo (Kosovo)
 Democratic Party of Turks (Republic of North Macedonia)
 Democratic Turkish Union of Romania (Romania)

References 

Political parties of minorities in Greece
Turkish political parties
Political parties established in 1991
1991 establishments in Greece
Turks in Greece